Debbie Byfield (born 5 June 1954) is a Jamaican sprinter. She competed in the women's 4 × 100 metres relay at the 1972 Summer Olympics. She placed seventh in the 400 metres at the 1975 Pan American Games. She is the mother of sprinter Kelli White.

References

1954 births
Living people
Athletes (track and field) at the 1972 Summer Olympics
Jamaican female sprinters
Olympic athletes of Jamaica
Athletes (track and field) at the 1975 Pan American Games
Pan American Games competitors for Jamaica
Athletes (track and field) at the 1978 Commonwealth Games
Commonwealth Games competitors for Jamaica
Place of birth missing (living people)
Olympic female sprinters
20th-century Jamaican women